Sebastián Cerezo (also spelled Sebastián Zerezo) was a Spanish dancer from La Mancha. In 1799, he was credited by Zamácola y Ocerín as one of the earliest and best dancers of the bolero, a Spanish dance developed between 1750 and 1772, which became very popular in Madrid, La Mancha, Andalusia and Murcia in the 1780s. According to Zamácola y Ocerín, Cerezo danced slowly and his particular way of dancing marked the definitive transition from seguidilla to bolero (from voleo, cf. vuelo, "flight"). This original slow way of dancing was promoted by Murcian dancer Requejo around 1800 in response to the faster style of bolero dancing that had become popular over the years.

Notes

References

Further reading

Spanish male dancers
Year of birth missing
Year of death missing
People from Castilla–La Mancha
18th-century Spanish dancers